The First Presbyterian Church of Lawton (also known as Centenary United Methodist Church of Lawton) is a historic church building at 8th Street and D Avenue in Lawton, Oklahoma. It was built in 1902 in a late-Gothic Revival style and was added to the National Register of Historic Places in 1979.

It consists of an original 1902-built  brick building and a 1946 extension.

History

References

Presbyterian churches in Oklahoma
Methodist churches in Oklahoma
Churches on the National Register of Historic Places in Oklahoma
Gothic Revival church buildings in Oklahoma
Churches completed in 1902
Buildings and structures in Comanche County, Oklahoma
National Register of Historic Places in Comanche County, Oklahoma